The 9th season of the television series Arthur was originally broadcast on PBS in the United States from December 27, 2004, to April 8, 2005, and contains 10 episodes. Cameron Ansell replaced Mark Rendall as the voice of Arthur,  Jessica Kardos replaced Patricia Rodriguez as the voice of Sue Ellen Armstrong, Eleanor Noble Replaced Evan Smirnow as the voice of George,  and Paul-Stuart Brown replaced Alex Hood as Brain. However, Brown shared this with Alex Hood who also voiced Brain since season seven. But in Seasons 10 and 11, Brown provides Brain alone. This is also the last season where Alex Hood voices Brain, as well as the first season where Cookie Jar Entertainment produced this series after the CINAR-Cookie Jar rebrand. It produced the series until the end of Season 15, when it merged with DHX Media.

Episodes

References

General references 
 
 
 
 

2004 American television seasons
2005 American television seasons
Arthur (TV series) seasons
2004 Canadian television seasons
2005 Canadian television seasons